The Rua'au by-election was a by-election in the Cook Islands seat of Rua'au.  It took place on 14 August 2003, and was precipitated by the death of Democratic Party MP Maria Heather.

Three candidates contested the by-election: the Democratic Party's Geoffrey Heather, husband of the former MP; the Cook Islands Party's Vaine Wichman, and Cook Islands National Party leader Teariki Heather.  The poll was won by Geoffrey Heather.

References

By-elections in the Cook Islands
2003 elections in Oceania
2003 in the Cook Islands